The Michurinsk constituency (No.170) was a Russian legislative constituency in Tambov Oblast from 1993 to 2007. The constituency covered rural upstate Tambov Oblast. In 2016 most of former Michurinsk constituency was put into Tambov constituency.

Members elected

Election results

1993

|-
! colspan=2 style="background-color:#E9E9E9;text-align:left;vertical-align:top;" |Candidate
! style="background-color:#E9E9E9;text-align:left;vertical-align:top;" |Party
! style="background-color:#E9E9E9;text-align:right;" |Votes
! style="background-color:#E9E9E9;text-align:right;" |%
|-
|style="background-color:"|
|align=left|Aleksey Ponomaryov
|align=left|Communist Party
|
|23.81%
|-
|style="background-color:"|
|align=left|Anatoly Zavrazhnov
|align=left|Independent
| -
|16.20%
|-
| colspan="5" style="background-color:#E9E9E9;"|
|- style="font-weight:bold"
| colspan="3" style="text-align:left;" | Total
| 
| 100%
|-
| colspan="5" style="background-color:#E9E9E9;"|
|- style="font-weight:bold"
| colspan="4" |Source:
|
|}

1995

|-
! colspan=2 style="background-color:#E9E9E9;text-align:left;vertical-align:top;" |Candidate
! style="background-color:#E9E9E9;text-align:left;vertical-align:top;" |Party
! style="background-color:#E9E9E9;text-align:right;" |Votes
! style="background-color:#E9E9E9;text-align:right;" |%
|-
|style="background-color:"|
|align=left|Aleksey Ponomaryov (incumbent)
|align=left|Communist Party
|
|46.38%
|-
|style="background-color:"|
|align=left|Anatoly Zavrazhnov
|align=left|Independent
|
|18.10%
|-
|style="background-color:"|
|align=left|Nina Krivelskaya
|align=left|Liberal Democratic Party
|
|8.76%
|-
|style="background-color:"|
|align=left|Aleksandr Babayev
|align=left|Independent
|
|7.82%
|-
|style="background-color:"|
|align=left|Yury Kobzev
|align=left|Independent
|
|5.88%
|-
|style="background-color:#000000"|
|colspan=2 |against all
|
|10.49%
|-
| colspan="5" style="background-color:#E9E9E9;"|
|- style="font-weight:bold"
| colspan="3" style="text-align:left;" | Total
| 
| 100%
|-
| colspan="5" style="background-color:#E9E9E9;"|
|- style="font-weight:bold"
| colspan="4" |Source:
|
|}

1999

|-
! colspan=2 style="background-color:#E9E9E9;text-align:left;vertical-align:top;" |Candidate
! style="background-color:#E9E9E9;text-align:left;vertical-align:top;" |Party
! style="background-color:#E9E9E9;text-align:right;" |Votes
! style="background-color:#E9E9E9;text-align:right;" |%
|-
|style="background-color:"|
|align=left|Aleksey Ponomaryov (incumbent)
|align=left|Communist Party
|
|21.47%
|-
|style="background-color:#C21022"|
|align=left|Nikolay Kochetov
|align=left|Party of Pensioners
|
|10.26%
|-
|style="background-color:"|
|align=left|Vladimir Dubovitsky
|align=left|Independent
|
|10.20%
|-
|style="background-color:#1042A5"|
|align=left|Lyudmila Kudinova
|align=left|Union of Right Forces
|
|8.38%
|-
|style="background-color:"|
|align=left|Aleksandr Shubin
|align=left|Independent
|
|7.59%
|-
|style="background-color:"|
|align=left|Aleksandr Ivanov
|align=left|Independent
|
|5.58%
|-
|style="background-color:#E2CA66"|
|align=left|Vladimir Ryabykh
|align=left|For Civil Dignity
|
|5.57%
|-
|style="background-color:"|
|align=left|Oleg Basov
|align=left|Independent
|
|3.68%
|-
|style="background-color:"|
|align=left|Kirill Kolonchin
|align=left|Independent
|
|3.14%
|-
|style="background-color:"|
|align=left|Sergey Filimonov
|align=left|Independent
|
|2.96%
|-
|style="background-color:"|
|align=left|Yury Safonov
|align=left|Our Home – Russia
|
|2.21%
|-
|style="background-color:"|
|align=left|Yury Kobzev
|align=left|Independent
|
|1.65%
|-
|style="background-color:"|
|align=left|Vadim Balak
|align=left|Independent
|
|0.89%
|-
|style="background-color:#FF4400"|
|align=left|Vladimir Filonov
|align=left|Andrey Nikolayev and Svyatoslav Fyodorov Bloc
|
|0.76%
|-
|style="background-color:#000000"|
|colspan=2 |against all
|
|12.51%
|-
| colspan="5" style="background-color:#E9E9E9;"|
|- style="font-weight:bold"
| colspan="3" style="text-align:left;" | Total
| 
| 100%
|-
| colspan="5" style="background-color:#E9E9E9;"|
|- style="font-weight:bold"
| colspan="4" |Source:
|
|}

2003

|-
! colspan=2 style="background-color:#E9E9E9;text-align:left;vertical-align:top;" |Candidate
! style="background-color:#E9E9E9;text-align:left;vertical-align:top;" |Party
! style="background-color:#E9E9E9;text-align:right;" |Votes
! style="background-color:#E9E9E9;text-align:right;" |%
|-
|style="background-color:"|
|align=left|Vladimir Dubovik
|align=left|Independent
|
|41.79%
|-
|style="background-color:"|
|align=left|Aleksey Ponomaryov (incumbent)
|align=left|Communist Party
|
|19.29%
|-
|style="background-color:#C21022"|
|align=left|Nikolay Kochetov
|align=left|Russian Pensioners' Party-Party of Social Justice
|
|16.35%
|-
|style="background-color:#7C73CC"|
|align=left|Andrey Getmanov
|align=left|Great Russia – Eurasian Union
|
|4.99%
|-
|style="background-color:"|
|align=left|Yevgeny Skriptsov
|align=left|Independent
|
|1.07%
|-
|style="background-color:#164C8C"|
|align=left|Vyacheslav Sechnev
|align=left|United Russian Party Rus'
|
|1.05%
|-
|style="background-color:#000000"|
|colspan=2 |against all
|
|12.14%
|-
| colspan="5" style="background-color:#E9E9E9;"|
|- style="font-weight:bold"
| colspan="3" style="text-align:left;" | Total
| 
| 100%
|-
| colspan="5" style="background-color:#E9E9E9;"|
|- style="font-weight:bold"
| colspan="4" |Source:
|
|}

Notes

References

Obsolete Russian legislative constituencies
Politics of Tambov Oblast